Docks (formerly Knopf's Music Hall) is a nightclub located at Spielbudenplatz in the St. Pauli district of Hamburg, Germany. It has a capacity between 1,250 and 1,500 people. The building opened in 1900 as a cinema. Notable past performers include Bob Dylan, Black Sabbath, Metallica, Motörhead, Ramones, Red Hot Chili Peppers, Def Leppard, Ozzy Osbourne, Dio, Iron Maiden, Nine Inch Nails and Liam Gallagher.

References

Music venues in Germany
Nightclubs in Hamburg
Music in Hamburg
Buildings and structures in Hamburg-Mitte